The Great Quadrangle, more popularly known as Tom Quad, is one of the quadrangles of Christ Church, Oxford, England. It is the largest college quad in Oxford, measuring 264 by 261 feet. Although it was begun by Cardinal Wolsey in 1525–1529, he was unable to complete it before his fall from power.

Wolsey planned a cloister, but only the starts of the arches on the walls, and of the supports jutting into the lawn were done; these can still be seen around the quadrangle. The main entrance was also left incomplete, and it is not known how the gatehouse was planned to look.  After some 150 years, the gatehouse was completed in 1681–1682 with Tom Tower, designed by Sir Christopher Wren, when John Fell was Dean. It is listed Grade I on the National Heritage List for England. A statue of Queen Anne on Tom Tower overlooks the main entrance to the Quad.

Description
The funds for the building of Tom Quad were found from the suppression of three Norbertine abbeys. It is dominated to the west by Tom Tower, designed by Sir Christopher Wren. On the east side is the entrance to Christ Church Cathedral and at the south-east corner is the entrance to the college dining hall. The north contains the homes of the canons of Christ Church, and much of the east side is taken up with the Deanery, in which the Dean of the college lives. On the north-east side, the quad leads, via Kilcannon, to Peckwater Quadrangle and the college library. In the north-west part of the quad is the Junior Common Room ("JCR"). Parts of the quad are still lived in by undergraduates, including the staircase above the Porter's lodge, known as "Bachelors' Row", to the left of the quadrangle when entered via Tom Gate. Bachelors' Row was only inhabited by first year male undergraduates until 2014, when the first female first year undergraduates took up residence there.

Mercury fountain
In the centre of the quad, there is an ornamental pond with a statue of Mercury. In the past, it was traditional for "hearties" (sporty students) to throw "aesthetes" (more artistic students) into this pond. Currently, entrance to Mercury carries a heavy fine for undergraduates. The pond also contains a large koi carp apparently worth a hefty sum, and donated by the Empress of Japan. The base of the fountain was designed by Sir Edwin Lutyens, the architect who designed much of India's modern capital New Delhi.

Lady Gwendolyn Cecil, in the biography of her father (the last Victorian Prime Minister Lord Salisbury), recounts how as a student in the 1840s, he rescued his bookish friends from being dunked in the fountains, by infiltrating the hearties and tipping off his friends about the time of the planned raid, and arranging with them a counter-ambush:

Gallery

See also
 Peckwater Quadrangle
 Blue Boar Quadrangle
 Meadow Building
 Christ Church Library
 Dunster House at Harvard

References

External links
 

Christ Church, Oxford
Grade I listed buildings in Oxford
Parks and open spaces in Oxford
Courtyards
Buildings and structures of the University of Oxford